SteamWorld Heist is a 2D turn-based tactics shooter developed by Swedish video game developer Image & Form. The third installment of the SteamWorld series and the sequel to SteamWorld Dig, SteamWorld Heist has the player control Captain Piper Faraday, a smuggler and occasional pirate, as she recruits a ragtag team of robots and sets out on a space adventure. The objective of the game is for players to board, loot, and shoot their way through enemy spaceships.

SteamWorld Heist was released on the Nintendo eShop for the Nintendo 3DS in Europe, the Americas, Australia and New Zealand on December 10, 2015. It was released worldwide for Microsoft Windows, OS X and Linux through Steam on June 7, 2016, for the PlayStation 4 and the PlayStation Vita via the PlayStation Store on June 7, 2016 in North America and on June 8, 2016 in Europe and Australia. It was released both physically and digitally (through the Nintendo eShop) for the Wii U on September 30, 2016 in Europe and Australia and in North America on October 20, 2016. It was released worldwide on the iOS App store on November 9, 2016. On December 28, 2017, the game was released worldwide for the Nintendo Switch (via Nintendo eShop) under the subtitle Ultimate Edition. It was released on Google's cloud gaming service Stadia on March 10, 2020, and on Amazon's cloud gaming service Luna on October 20, 2020.

Gameplay 
SteamWorld Heist is a side-scrolling strategy game with focus on skill rather than chance. The core gameplay consists of recruiting a team of steam-driven robots, boarding enemy spaceships and taking down rivaling robot factions in turn-based shootouts. A majority of the game's levels are procedurally generated.

In battle, the player controls the aiming of all firearms and can bounce bullets off the environment for ricocheting trick shots. As the game progresses, players can upgrade and customize their robot crew with different consumables, equipment, weapons, and hats. Some weapons are equipped with laser sights to assist the player with the free aiming.

The game has over 100 different weapons and almost 100 hats to collect. These can be found as treasure during missions or bought in designated shops. Hats are primarily obtained by shooting them off opponents' heads and collecting them.

After finishing the game, players have the option to start the game again with New Game+.

Development

The Xbox One version is on hold in favour of future projects from Image & Form.

Soundtrack 
The game's soundtrack, Music From SteamWorld Heist, is composed and recorded by the steampunk band Steam Powered Giraffe. The band members appear as robots in different bars (such as The Spine at Lola's bar before it got shut down) throughout the game while performing songs from the soundtrack.

Downloadable content
The first downloadable content pack, called The Outsider, was showcased at the Penny Arcade Expo in early April 2016 and was released on April 28, 2016 for the Nintendo 3DS. When Image & Form announced the release date of SteamWorld Heist for the PlayStation 4 and the PlayStation Vita, the company confirmed that The Outsider would release for those systems on the same date as the full game. It was also available for Microsoft Windows, Mac OS X, and Linux on release. The Outsider was included on disc in the Wii U and PS4 retail editions of the game. The Outsider was included within the Nintendo Switch's Ultimate Edition port of the game.

Reception 

SteamWorld Heist has received positive reviews on all platforms, with current scores ranging from 81 to 91 on Metacritic.
 9.5/10 - Nintendo World Report: "The definitive Nintendo 3DS game of 2015 is here. No joke."
 9/10 - Nintendo Life: "Excellent."
 8.8 - IGN: "SteamWorld Heist stole my heart."
 8.5/10 - Destructoid: "Everyone can find something they'll like."
 5/5 - USgamer: "I loved SteamWorld Heist and I think everyone should play it."
 5/5 - Daily Mirror: "As much a work of art as a video-game."
 4/5 - Hardcore Gamer: "SteamWorld Heist exudes charm and goodwill."

Notes

References

External links 

2015 video games
2016 video games
Action-adventure games
Indie video games
IOS games
Linux games
Nintendo 3DS eShop games
Nintendo Switch games
MacOS games
PlayStation 4 games
PlayStation Network games
PlayStation Vita games
Single-player video games
Steampunk video games
Video games developed in Sweden
Wii U games
Wii U eShop games
Windows games
Xbox One games
Video games set on fictional planets
Video games using procedural generation
SteamWorld
Stadia games
Rising Star Games games